Shane Crosse (born 21 September 2001) is an Irish jockey who competes in flat racing.

Background 

Crosse comes from Cahir in County Tipperary in Ireland. His father Matt Crosse is a former jump jockey and brother Nathan Crosse is a flat-racing jockey. Crosse took part in pony racing and became an apprentice jockey at the yard of trainer Joseph O'Brien while he was still at school.

Career 

Crosse rode his first winner on 13 April 2018 when steering G Force to victory for trainer Adrian Keatley in a handicap at Naas. That season he was crowned Irish champion apprentice jockey. On 28 September 2019 he won his first Group race on the Joseph O'Brien-trained Speak in Colours in the Group 3 Renaissance Stakes at the Curragh.

The 2020 season brought Crosse his first Group 1 victory, when Pretty Gorgeous won the Fillies' Mile at Newmarket on 9 October. He had previously missed his intended ride on Galileo Chrome in the St Leger Stakes due to a positive COVID-19 test. Galileo Chrome went on to win the race under Tom Marquand.

In 2021 Crosse had another Group 1 success when riding Thundering Nights in the Pretty Polly Stakes at the Curragh.

On 1 May 2022 Crosse won the Group 1 Prix Ganay at Longchamp in Paris on State of Rest, who then provided Crosse with his first Royal Ascot victory when they won the Prince of Wales's Stakes on 15 June.

Major wins

 France
 Prix Ganay - (1) - State Of Rest (2022)

 Great Britain
 Fillies' Mile - (1) - Pretty Gorgeous (2020)
 Prince of Wales's Stakes - (1) - State Of Rest (2022)

 Ireland
 Pretty Polly Stakes - (1) - Thundering Nights (2021)

References 

2001 births
Living people
Irish jockeys
People from Cahir